Ancillina sumatrana is a species of sea snail, a marine gastropod mollusk in the family Ancillariidae.

Description

Distribution

References

  Thiele J., 1925. Gastropoden der Deutschen Tiefsee-Expedition. In:. Wissenschaftliche Ergebnisse der Deutschen Tiefsee-Expedition auf dem Dampfer "Valdivia" 1898–1899  II. Teil, vol. 17, No. 2, Gustav Fischer, Berlin [See Kilburn, 1996, for details on South Africa page(s): Page 37-382
 Lozouet P. (1992) New Pliocene and Oligocene Olividae (Mollusca, Gastropoda) from France and the Mediterranean area. Contributions to Tertiary and Quaternary Geology 29(1–2): 27–37.

Ancillariidae
Gastropods described in 1925